Odonatomermis is a genus of nematodes belonging to the family Mermithidae.

Species:
 Odonatomermis atlaensis Rubzov, 1973 
 Odonatomermis badia Rubzov, 1973 
 Odonatomermis polyclada Rubzov, 1973

References

Mermithidae